Odontopodisma montana, known as the Romanian mountain grasshopper, is a species of insect in family Acrididae. It is found in Hungary and Romania.

Sources 

Acrididae
Insects described in 1962
Taxonomy articles created by Polbot